Petronella Barker may refer to:

 Petronella Barker (actress, born 1942), British actress
 Petronella Barker (actress, born 1965), British-born Norwegian actress